Mir Thebo (Sindhi: مير ٿيٻو) is left-wing politician from Mehar, Sindh, Pakistan. He later left Pakistan, and now lives Austin, Texas, United States.

Early life
Thebo born on 15 December 1946 at village Ghari, Mehar in Sindh. He got primary education from village Ghari. Thebo passed his matriculation examinations from Mehar and Shikarpur. Later, Sachal Sarmast college Hyderabad, Sindh and Sindh University, Jamshoro from where he did his Master's in Political Science.

Political activism
He started his political career as a student worker. Jam Saqi, a fiery student leader of yesteryear's, founded Sindh National Students Federation (SNSF) – a student wing of Communist Party on November 3, 1968, of which he was the founder president with Nadeem Akhter as the founding vice president and Mir Thebo as general secretary of the organization. Thebo was imprisoned 4 times,  2 days, then Ayub Khan regime 3 months, Yahya Khan's martial law 6 months, again Yahya martial law 6 months because of his political activities.

See also 

Politics of Pakistan
 G M Syed
 Ghaus Bakhsh Bizenjo

References

External links 
 Notes From My Memory: Mir Thebo

1946 births
Pakistani politicians
Pakistani communists
Living people
Sindhi people
International Marxist Tendency